Laus Polyphoniae is the summer edition of the Festival van Vlaanderen (Festival of Flanders)-Antwerp. Since 1994 this early music and polyphony festival takes place in the last weeks of August.

Every edition has its central theme or compositor. An ensemble in residence presents several concerts regarding the annual theme.

Past themes:

Orlandus Lassus (1994)
16th Century Antwerp Music Printers (1995)
I Fiamminghi in Italia (1996)
Johannes Ockeghem and His Era (1997)
 Música Ibérica (1998)
Anthony van Dyck and the Music of His Era (1999)
The first polyphonists (2000)
Josquin Desprez and his era (2001)
Musica Britannica (2002)
Philippus de Monte and the Habsburg Courts (2003)
Polifonia Italiana (2004)
Jacob Obrecht and His Era (2005) - Capilla Flamenca
Conquista y reconquista (2006) - Ensemble Elyma
Franse polyfonie (2007) - Ensemble Clément Janequin
Music in the Hanseatic Cities (2008) - Concerto Palatino
Cappella Sistina (2009) - Collegium Vocale Gent
Manu Scriptum (2010) - Huelgas Ensemble
Sons Portugueses (2011) - La Colombina
Mare Adriatico (2012) - Daedalus en Dialogos
Spem in Alium by Thomas Tallis (2013)

External links 
Festival van Vlaanderen-Antwerpen

Culture in Antwerp
Early music festivals
Music festivals in Belgium
Tourist attractions in Antwerp
Music festivals established in 1994
Summer events in Belgium